Pierre Martin (born 27 September 1943) is a former member of the Senate of France, who represented the Somme department.  He is a member of the Union for a Popular Movement. He had initially been elected in 1995 and later re-elected in 2004(later standing down in 2014).

References
Page on the Senate website

1943 births
Living people
Union for a Popular Movement politicians
French Senators of the Fifth Republic
Senators of Somme (department)
Place of birth missing (living people)